Captivity is a state wherein humans or other animals are confined to a particular space and prevented from leaving or moving freely.

Captivity may also refer to:
 Captivity (animal), the keeping of either domesticated animals (livestock and pets) or wild animals
 Captivity (film), a 2007 U.S.-Russia thriller film by Roland Joffe and starring Elisha Cuthbert
 Babylonian captivity of Judah, as described in the Bible
 HMS Captivity, two ships

See also
 Babylonian captivity (disambiguation)
 Captive (disambiguation)
 The Captive (disambiguation)
 Captive company, a subsidiary
 Captivity narrative, genre of stories about people being captured by "uncivilized" enemies
 Hostage, a person or entity which is held by one of two belligerent parties
 Imprisonment, restraint of a person's liberty

pt:Cativeiro